Marlene Schmotz (born 6 March 1994) is a German World Cup alpine ski racer, specializing in Super-G.

She competed at the World Championships 2019.

World Championship results

References

External links

 

1994 births
Living people
German female alpine skiers
21st-century German women